Cassandra (Cassie) Bujan (born 25 April 1996) is a Canadian volleyball player from Anola, Manitoba. She played five years at the University of Manitoba, and made her first appearance on Team Canada in the 2019 FISU Summer Universiade in Naples, Italy.

She has since been on the Canadian women's national volleyball team for the 2021 FIVB Volleyball Women's Nations League and the  2021 Women's NORCECA Volleyball Championship.

She played for Arenal Emevé in the Spanish Superliga in 2020–21.

Clubs 
 2019 –  Arenal Emevé

References

External links 
 
 Cassandra Bujan page on Volleybox

Living people
1996 births
Canadian women's volleyball players
People from Eastman Region, Manitoba
Sportspeople from Manitoba
Liberos
University of Manitoba alumni